The United States of America (USA) competed at the 2000 Summer Olympics in Sydney, Australia. 586 competitors, 333 men and 253 women, took part in 265 events in 31 sports.

Medalists

The following U.S. competitors won medals at the games. In the by discipline sections below, medalists' names are bolded. 

|style="text-align:left; width:78%; vertical-align:top;"|

|  style="text-align:left; width:22%; vertical-align:top;"|

Archery

All three of the American men won their first matches.  Two were defeated in the second round, but Vic Wunderle made it all the way to the finals before being defeated by home-crowd favorite Simon Fairweather.  The squad was surprised by Italy in the team round semifinal, and was forced to shoot a tie-breaker against Russia in the bronze medal match to claim their medal.  Karen Scavotto faced Denise Parker in the first round, guaranteeing an elimination for one of the American women.

Men

Women

Athletics

Men
Track and road events

Field events

Combined events – Decathlon

Women
Track and road events

Field events

Combined events – Heptatlon

Badminton

Baseball

Baseball was open only to male amateurs in 1992 and 1996. As a result, the Americans and other nations where professional baseball is developed relied on collegiate players, while Cubans used their most experienced veterans, who technically were considered amateurs as they nominally held other jobs, but in fact trained full-time. In 2000, pros were admitted, but the MLB refused to release its players in 2000, 2004, and 2008, and the situation changed only a little: the Cubans still used their best players, while the Americans started using minor leaguers. The IOC cited the absence of the best players as the main reason for baseball being dropped from the Olympic program.

Summary

Roster

Preliminary round

Semifinal

Gold medal game

Basketball

Summary

Men

Roster

|}
| valign="top" |
 Head coach
 Rudy Tomjanovich
 Assistant coach(es)
 Larry Brown
 Gene Keady
 Tubby Smith
|}

Group play

Quarterfinal

Semifinal

Gold medal game

Women

Squad

|}
| valign="top" |
 Head coach
 Nell Fortner
 Assistant coach(es)
 Geno Auriemma
 Peggy Gillom
|}

Group play

Quarterfinal

Semifinal

Gold medal game

Boxing

Legend: RSC – Referee stopped contest

Canoeing

Slalom

Sprint
Men

Women

Legend: QF – Qualify to final based on position in heat; QS – Qualify to semifinal based on time in roundAll ranks based on time in round

Cycling

Road

Men

Women

Track

Time trial

Sprint

Pursuit

Points race

Keirin

Mountain biking

Diving

Laura Wilkinson staged a comeback during the finals of the Women's 10 metre platform and won the only diving medal for the United States during the 2000 Sydney Olympics. The Chinese divers were in first and second heading into the finals.

Men

Women

Equestrian

Dressage
(Total scores are the average of all three rounds for the individual competition, and the three best total scores of individual round 1 for the team competition.)

Eventing

Jumping

Fencing

Men

Women

Football

Summary

Men

Roster
Over aged players are marked with * (max 3).
Head coach:  Clive Charles

Stand-by players

Group play

Quarterfinal

Semifinal

Bronze Medal match

Women

Squad
Matches played in parentheses denotes player came from the bench

Results
Preliminaries

Semifinal

Gold Medal match

Gymnastics

Artistic

Men
Team

Individual finals

Women
Team

Individual finals

Trampoline

Judo

Men

Women

Modern pentathlon

Rowing

Men

Women

Qualification Legend: FA=Final A (medal); FB=Final B (non-medal); S=Semifinals A/B; R=Repechage

Sailing

Men

Women

Open
Fleet racing

Mixed racing

Shooting

Men

Women

Softball

Summary

Roster

Preliminary round

Semifinals

Bronze medal game

Gold medal game

Swimming

Men

Qualifiers for the latter rounds (Q) of all events were decided on a time only basis, therefore positions shown are overall results versus competitors in all heats.
* – Indicates athlete swam in the preliminaries but not in the final race.

Women

Qualifiers for the latter rounds (Q) of all events were decided on a time only basis, therefore positions shown are overall results versus competitors in all heats.
* – Indicates athlete swam in the preliminaries but not in the final race.

Synchronised swimming

Table Tennis

Men

Women

Taekwondo

Tennis

Men

Women

Triathlon

At the inaugural Olympic triathlon competition, the United States was represented by three men and three women.  Two of the women placed in the top eight, with Joanna Zeiger missing a medal by about 17 seconds.

Volleyball

Beach

* – Heidger & Wong advanced from the elimination pool by having the highest point differential among losers

Indoor

Summary

Men

Roster

Coach: Doug Beal

Group play

|}

Women

Roster

Coach: Mick Haley

Group play

|}

Quarterfinals

Semifinals

Bronze Medal match

Water polo

Summary

Men

Squad

Head Coach: John Vargas

Results

Preliminary Round

Quarterfinals

5th to 8th place classification

5th place match

Women

Squad

Head Coach:

Results

Preliminary Round

Semifinals

Gold Medal Match

Weightlifting

Wrestling

Freestyle

Greco-Roman

See also
 United States at the 1999 Pan American Games

References

Wallechinsky, David (2004). The Complete Book of the Summer Olympics (Athens 2004 Edition). Toronto, Canada. . 
International Olympic Committee (2001). The Results. Retrieved November 12, 2005.
Sydney Organising Committee for the Olympic Games (2001). Official Report of the XXVII Olympiad Volume 1: Preparing for the Games. Retrieved November 20, 2005.
Sydney Organising Committee for the Olympic Games (2001). Official Report of the XXVII Olympiad Volume 2: Celebrating the Games. Retrieved November 20, 2005.
Sydney Organising Committee for the Olympic Games (2001). The Results. Retrieved November 20, 2005.
International Olympic Committee Web Site

Nations at the 2000 Summer Olympics
2000
Summer Olympics